Tina Darragh (born 1950) is an American poet who was one of the original members of the Language group of poets.

Biography
Darragh was born in Pittsburgh and grew up in the south suburb of McDonald, Pennsylvania. She began writing in 1968 and studied poetry in Washington, D.C. at Trinity University from 1970 to 1972. Between 1974 and 1976, she worked with Some of Us Press and at the Mass Transit community bookstore and writing workshop.

Mass Transit, and after it Folio bookshop, became focal points for much of the poetic activity that was to result in the East Coast wing of the "Language" group, and here Darragh met other poets, including Susan Howe, Diane Ward, Doug Lang, Joan Retallack, and P. Inman, all of whom were also to become key members of the group.

She and Inman are married and live in Greenbelt, Maryland.

Darragh's extensive list of publications include on the corner to off the corner (1981), Striking Resemblance (Burning Deck, 1988), a(gain)2 st the odds (1989), and adv. fans - the 1968 series (1993). Her work has been included in numerous anthologies, including the important "Language"-oriented anthology, In the American Tree (edited by Ron Silliman). In 1998, her work was published in the anthology etruscan reader VIII (with Douglas Oliver & Randolph Healy) and included selections from "The Dream Rim Instructions + SEE References" and "fractals <<—>> l-in-error". Darragh has also been involved in numerous collaborative efforts with others including the recent Belladonna Elders Series No. 8: Jane Sprague / Tina Darragh / Diane Ward published by Belladonna Books in 2009.

Notes

References

External links
An interview - dcpoetry.com
A poem - upenn.edu
Another poem and a photograph - poetryproject.com
on the corner   to   off the corner facsimile & pdf at e c l i p s e
etruscan reader VIII: Tina Darragh, Douglas Oliver & Randolph Healy link to Salt Publishing page on etruscan reader VIII with brief description of Darragh's poetics
Darragh reading her poem: Collective Lament for Banishing Animals from History Recorded 25 January 2007 at the University of Maine
Doug Lang on Tina Darragh an in-depth look at Darragh's poetry, life, and poetics.
Opposable Dumbs downloadable ebook at zimZalla publishing.
The Other Room - interview film of 28 minute interview for The Other Room in Manchester, UK, July 2009.
The Other Room - reading films of reading for The Other Room in Manchester, UK, July 2009.
Guide to the Tina Darragh literary papers, 1974-2017, Special Collections Research Center, Estelle and Melvin Gelman Library, The George Washington University.

1950 births
Language poets
Living people
Modernist women writers
Writers from Pittsburgh
Trinity Washington University alumni
American women poets
21st-century American women